Saulius Šaltenis (born 24 December 1945) is a Lithuanian writer, newspaper editor, and politician.  In 1990, he was among those who signed the Act of the Re-Establishment of the State of Lithuania. He served as the Minister of Culture from 1996 to 1999 in the Government of Gediminas Vagnorius

Biography
Šaltenis was born into a family of Lithuanian teachers in Utena, Lithuania. He attended Utena Secondary School No. 2 from 1963 to 1964 and studied philology at Vilnius University while working as a laborer at the Vilnius Drill Factory. After his freshman year, he was drafted into the Soviet Army and did not continue his studies after his return. From 1969 to 1972 worked on the editorial board at the Lithuanian Film Studios. From 1994 to 1996, he was the editor-in-chief at the news daily Lietuvos aidas.

Šaltenis has been a member of the Lithuanian Writers' Union since 1971, and a member of the presidium of this union since 1986. He is also a board member of the Lithuanian Cinematographer's Union, as well as a member of the Journalist's Society and of the Lithuanian Citizens' Charter.

Political career
In 1988, Šaltenis joined the pro-independence Sąjūdis (Lithuanian Reform Movement) and was elected to the Supreme Council – Reconstituent Seimas, becoming a signatory of the Act of the Re-Establishment of the State of Lithuania. He was reelected to the Seimas until 2000. He served as the Minister of Culture from 1996 to 1999 in the Government of Gediminas Vagnorius. Until 2000, he was also vice-chairman of the Homeland Union (Lithuanian Conservatives).

Writing career
Šaltenis's first stories were published in 1963 in the cultural journal Literatūra ir menas. In 1966, he published his first book, a collection of short stories titled Atostogos (Holidays). He co-wrote the first Lithuanian musicals Ugnies medžioklė su varovais (Hunting with Fire; 1976) with the prose writer  and Komunarų gatvė (Communard street; 1978) with Sigitas Geda. He wrote the script for the film version of his story Riešutų duona (Nut Bread), as well as for the films Skrydis per Lietuvą (Flight over Lithuania) and Herkus Mantas (Herkus Monte). In 2017, he wrote the script for Eimuntas Nekrošius's staging of his story Kalės vaikai (Children of a Bitch). In 2020, he won the Lithuanian National Prize for Culture and Arts.

Published works
 Atostogos: apsakymai. – Vilnius: Vaga, 1966. – 75 p.
 Riešutų duona; Henrikas Montė: apysakos / dail. Vladislovas Žilius. – Vilnius: Vaga, 1972. – 176 p.: iliustr.
 Duokiškis: apysaka. – Vilnius: Vaga, 1977. – 65 p.
 Škac, mirtie, visados škac! ; Jasonas: pjesės. – Vilnius: Vaga, 1978. – 141 p.
 Atminimo cukrus: apsakymai ir apysaka. – Vilnius: Vaga, 1983. – 187 p.
 Apysakos / dail. Elvyra Kriaučiūnaitė. – Vilnius: Vaga, 1986. – 251 p.
 Lituanica; Duokiškio baladės: pjesės / iliustr. Henrikas Ratkevičius. – Vilnius: Vaga, 1989. – 162 p. – 
 Kalės vaikai: romanas. – Vilnius: Vaga, 1990. – 194 p. – 
 Pokalbiai prieš aušrą: publicistika. – Vilnius: Lietuvos aidas, 1995. – 184 p. – 
 Riešutų duona: apysakos ir apsakymai / sud. Kęstutis Urba. – Kaunas: Šviesa, 2003. – 174 p. – 
 Kalės vaikai: rinktinė. – Vilnius: Žaltvykslė, 2006. – 415 p. – 
 Pjesės / parengė Agnė Iešmantaitė. – Vilnius: Žaltvykslė, 2006. – 111 p. – 
 Kalės vaikai: romanas / parengė Agnė Iešmantaitė. – Vilnius: Žaltvykslė, 2006. – 115 p. – 
 Proza: novelės ir apysakos / parengė Agnė Iešmantaitė. – Vilnius: Žaltvykslė, 2006. – 129 p. – 
 Lietuvių grotesko ir ironijos dramos: Juozas Grušas, Kazys Saja, Saulius Šaltenis: skaitiniai / sud. Agnė Iešmantaitė. – Vilnius: Žaltvykslė, 2007. – 223 p. – 
 Demonų amžius: proza ir dramaturgija. – Vilnius: Tyto alba, 2014. – 295 p. – 
 Žydų karalaitės dienoraštis: romanas. – Vilnius: Tyto alba, 2015. – 150 p. – 
 Basas ir laimingas: romanas. – Vilnius: Tyto alba, 2016. – 211 p. – 
 Diary of a Jewish Girl: novel / trans. Marija Marcinkute. – Nottingham, UK: Noir Press, 2020. – 176 p. – 
 Geležiniai gyvatės kiaušiniai: romanas. – Vilnius: Tyto alba, 2020. – 197 p. – 
 Bees on the Snow (Kalės vaikai): novel / trans. by Elizabeth Novickas. – Flossmoor, IL: Pica Pica Press, 2021. 158 p. –

External links
 2016 interview (in English)

References

1945 births
Living people
Ministers of Culture of Lithuania
Members of the Seimas
Homeland Union politicians
Lithuanian writers
Lithuanian newspaper editors